Martin Joseph Marquez (born 8 October 1964) is an English actor.

He is best known on television for his role as Gino Primirola, the head barman, in the British television comedy drama Hotel Babylon. He also played Danny Pearce in The Bill from 1993 to 1995, and Neil in EastEnders in 2002, and he has appeared in Doc Martin alongside his real life brother John Marquez, The Catherine Tate Show, Murder Most Horrid, and Plastic Man.

Early life
Marquez was born in Coventry, Warwickshire to a Spanish father and an English mother. Marquez's father formerly worked as a waiter at the Costa Brava Ritz Hotel and later opened a chip shop when the family moved to Binley Woods. Martin attended King Henry VIII School in Coventry. He worked as a personal trainer and a barman, before beginning his career in acting.

Career
Marquez first appeared on television in The Bill, where he portrayed Detective Sergeant Danny Pearce. He also had small roles in such series as Doc Martin, The Catherine Tate Show, Elizabeth I, The Business, EastEnders and Bedtime. From 2006 to 2009, he played the character of head barman on the television series Hotel Babylon. In 2013, he appeared in new ITV comedy drama The Job Lot, playing security guard Paul.

He is also known for his theatre work, including Trevor Nunn's revival of Anything Goes in 2002, in which he played Moonface Martin and Terry Johnson's play Insignificance. He has performed as a comedy team, The Brothers Marquez, with his brother John Marquez, who also portrayed his fictional brother in a "Doc Martin" episode. He has played the lead role of Dad in Billy Elliot the Musical at the Victoria Palace Theatre in London's West End since November 2010.

In October 2013, he went on to play the role of Captain Dana Holmes in From Here to Eternity the Musical.

Filmography

Film

Television

Personal life
He has three sons and two daughters, including Ramona Marquez, who is known for playing Karen in Outnumbered.

References

External links
 

1964 births
Living people
Actors from Coventry
English dramatists and playwrights
English male stage actors
English people of Spanish descent
English male soap opera actors
Male actors from Warwickshire